Levi Schwiebbe (born 13 September 1986) is a retired Dutch footballer who played as a midfielder.

Career
Schwiebbe began his career with WSE Waddinxveen and was than scouted from ADO Den Haag. He was sent on loan to Haarlem in January 2009. In 2010, he joined AGOVV Apeldoorn and stayed until the summer of 2012 when he signed with FC Volendam.

Coaching career
During his time as an active player for SVV Scheveningen, Schwiebbe also worked as the person in charge of the club's youth development. In March 2019, Schwiebbe began working at ADO Den Haag as a physical coach. From there, he worked in several roles within the academy of ADO.

References

External links
 Voetbal International profile 
 Player Stats – Levi Schwiebbe – wjz.com
 Profile on Goal.com
 

1986 births
Living people
Dutch footballers
Association football midfielders
ADO Den Haag players
HFC Haarlem players
AGOVV Apeldoorn players
FC Volendam players
Eredivisie players
Eerste Divisie players
Tweede Divisie players
Derde Divisie players
Footballers from Gouda, South Holland
SVV Scheveningen players